Bing Liu (October 20, 1982 – May 2, 2020) was a Chinese-born American scientist and coronavirus researcher living and researching in the United States. He was a Research Assistant Professor of Computational & Systems Biology Department at the University of Pittsburgh School of Medicine. He was 37 years old at the time of his death, in which he was shot dead in his home. The case received American and Chinese media coverage.

Death
Liu was found dead at his home on May 2, 2020. His work on coronaviruses led to speculation that his murder was related to his work, but Pittsburgh Police said that he was shot as a result of a murder-suicide. The gunman was 46-year-old software engineer Hao Gu. The police said that the murder was the result of a dispute over an intimate partner and that after murdering Bing Liu the gunman had gone back to his car and shot himself.

Works

Books
 B Liu. Computational Modeling of Biological Pathways: Probabilistic Approximation and Analysis Techniques.  Lambert Academic Publishing, Jan 2012. (176 pages)

Most recent articles
 W Sun, V Tyurin, G Mao, I Shrivastava, B Liu, Y Zhai, S Korolev, A Abramov, P Angelova, I Miller, O Beharier, H Dar, O Kapralov, T Hastings, J Greenamyre, C Chu, I Bahar, Y Sadovsky, H Bayır, Y Tyurina, R He, V Kagan "iPLA2G6 Protects Cells against Ferroptosis by Hydrolyzing the Lipid Signal of Death, 15-HpETE-PE: Relevance to Parkinson Disease Pathogenesis, "Nature Neuroscience, under review (2020).
 B Liu. "A Model Checking-based Analysis Framework for Systems Biology Models", The 57th ACM/IEEE Design Automation Conference (DAC), San Francisco, US (2020). IEEE, pp. 1–6 
 Q Shi, F Pei, G Silverman, S Pak, D Perlmutter, B Liu, I Bahar." Mechanisms of Action of Autophagy Modulators Dissected by Quantitative Systems Pharmacology Analysis," International Journal of Molecular Sciences, 21(8). 2855 (2020). doi: 10.3390/ijms21082855   
 S Thermozier, W Hou, X Zhang, D Shields, R Fisher, H Bayir, V Kagam, J Yu, B Liu, I Bahar, M W Epperly, P Wipf, H Wang, and J S Greenberger. "Anti-Ferroptosis Drug Enhances Total Body Irradiation Mitigation by Drugs that Block Apoptosis and Necroptosis," Radiation Research, [Epub ahead of print] (2020). doi: 10.1667/RR15486.1    
 O Kapralov, Q Yang, H Dar, Y Tyurina, T Anthonymuthu, R Kim, C St. Croix, K Mikulska-Ruminska, B Liu, I Shrivastava, V Tyurin, H-C Ting, Y Wu, Y Gao, R Domingues, D Stoyanovsky, R Mallampalli, I Bahar, D Gabrilovich, H Bayir, and V Kagan "Redox Lipid Reprogramming Commands Susceptibility of Macrophages and Microglia to Ferroptotic Death," Nature Chemical Biology, 16:2780-290 (2020). doi: 10.1038/s41589-019-0462-8  
 S Thermozier, X Zhang, W Hou, R Fisher, M W Epperly, B Liu, I Bahar, S Markovina, C Luke, G Silverman, and J S Greenberger. "Radioresistance of Serpinb3a-/- Mice and Derived Hematopoietic and Marrow Stromal Cell Lines," Radiation Research, 192(3):267-281 (2019). doi: 10.1667/RR15379.1.    
 F Pei, H Li, B Liu, I Bahar. "Quantitative Systems Pharmacological Analysis of Drugs of Abuse Reveals the Pleiotropy of Their Targets and the Effector Role of mTORC1", Frontiers in Pharmacology, 10:191 (2019). doi: 10.3389/fphar.2019.00191

Most highly cited articles
 V E Kagan, G Mao, F Qu, J P F Angeli, S Doll, C S Croix, H Dar, B Liu, V A Tyurin, V B Ritov, O A Kapralov, A A Amoscato, J Jiang, T Anthonymuthu, D Mohammadyani, Q Yang, J Klein-Seetharaman, S Watkins, I Bahar, J Greenberger, R Mallampalli, B R Stockwell, Y Y Tyurina, M Conrad, H Bayir. Oxidized Arachidonic and Adrenic PEs Navigate Cells to Ferroptosis, Nature Chemical Biology, 13:81-90 (2017). doi:10.1038/nchembio.2238. Cited 320 times according to Google Scholar 
 B Liu, J Zhang, P Y Tan, D Hsu, A M Blom, B Leong, S Sethi, B Ho, J L Ding, P S Thiagarajan. A Computational and Experimental Study of the Regulatory Mechanisms of the Complement System. "PLoS Computational Biology, 7(1):e1001059 (2011). 
 H Zhou, S Gao, N N Nguyen, M Fan, J Jin, B Liu, L Zhao, G Xiong, M Tan, S Li, L Wong. Stringent Homology-based Prediction of H. sapiens-M. tuberculosis H37Rv Protein-Protein Interactions. Biology Direct'', 9(5):1-52 (2014). Cited 50 times according to Google Scholar

References

Sources

 Bing Liu, personal site / Research Assistant Professor, Computational & Systems Biology Department, School of Medicine, University of Pittsburgh
 Bing Liu, Ph.D., Research Assistant Professor, Ph.D. in Computational Systems Biology, National U of Singapore

2020 murders in the United States
Chinese expatriates in the United States
Chinese scientists
Crimes in Pittsburgh
Deaths by firearm in Pennsylvania
People murdered in Pennsylvania
Chinese people murdered abroad
2020 deaths
1982 births